Francia Elena Márquez Mina (born 1 December 1981) is a Colombian human-rights and environmental activist and lawyer, who is the 13th and current Vice President of Colombia. She was born in Yolombó, a village in the Cauca Department. She first became an activist at 13, when construction of a dam threatened her community. After taking office, she became the first Afro-Colombian vice president in the country's history. She is also the second woman to hold the post, after Marta Lucía Ramírez. In August 2020, Márquez announced her candidacy in the 2022 Colombian presidential election and sought the nomination for the Historic Pact for Colombia coalition. She was later chosen by the coalition's nominee, Gustavo Petro, to be his running mate.

In 2018, she was awarded the Goldman Environmental Prize for her work to stop illegal gold mining in her community of La Toma and for her community organising. Márquez led a protest march of 80 women who trekked 560 kilometres (350 miles) to the capital city of Bogotá, and demanded the removal of all illegal miners from their community. In 2019, the BBC listed Francia Márquez on their 100 Women list for that year.

Personal life 
Márquez was born on 1 December 1981, in the village of Yolombó, located in the Suárez municipality of the Cauca department. Her parents are miners, although her mother is also a farmer and midwife. Márquez described her childhood as "marked by spending time at my maternal grandparents' house, another time with my mother and the rest with my paternal grandparents".
Márquez is an agricultural technician graduate from the National Learning Service of Colombia. In 2020 she obtained a law degree from the University of Santiago de Cali.

Activism

Ovejas river defence

From 1994 to 1997   , Márquez participated in the defence of the Ovejas river, a significant water source for her community. Companies such as Unión Fenosa planned to divert the river toward the Salvajina hydroelectric dam. Her community succeeded in preventing the project.

Other companies, such as AngloGold Ashanti, which intended to mine gold in the region, threatening the river's cleanliness, began to invest in the community by building roads and donating school supplies. Márquez recalls that while some appreciated the company's generosity, others were suspicious, stating "others amongst [us] thought that, 'nothing comes for free; they must have an ulterior motive.' And there was already talk of a mining project, so we listened to our elders, and we said 'no' to AngloGold." The company responded by delivering leaflets to residents' homes, threatening eviction.

Opposition to illegal mining

During the presidencies of Álvaro Uribe and Juan Manuel Santos, the invitation of international mining companies to extract natural resources in Colombia increased. In 2009, Márquez helped lead protests against attempts by the government to evict Afro-Colombians, especially artisanal miners, from ancestral land near the town of La Toma. The interior ministry had granted companies such as AngloGold the right to mine for gold in the area without consulting residents. Márquez, along with members of the community council of La Toma, filed a lawsuit challenging the decision. During this time, several members of the committee received death threats. Paramilitary groups subsequently targeted the community, killing several artisanal miners on the river banks. Márquez prevailed when the constitutional court ruled in her community's favour.

In 2013, Márquez became a legal representative in La Toma. She also took part in the permanent assembly in Cauca, which advocated for the National Land Agency to protect territory.
The following year, Márquez's community faced environmental damage from illegal miners drilling boreholes near the Ovejas river, poisoned due to mercury use. Márquez again sought legal action and worked with other community members to combat environmental damage caused by illegal miners. However, in October 2014, Márquez was forced to flee to Cali with her children after receiving threats from paramilitary groups.

March to Bogotá
Facing increased threats from illegal mining, Márquez organised a 350-kilometre long march from Cauca to Bogotá in 2014. The March, which consisted of 80 Afro-Colombian women, saw an increase in attention to illegal mining in Cauca, as well as the social and environmental destruction the community and suffering the illegal mining had caused. The party arrived in Bogotá ten days later and began to protest, demanding an end to the illegal mining.

After protesting for 22 days, Márquez, along with other representatives of La Toma, reached an agreement with the Colombian government. Government officials decided to take action against illegal mining and established a task force in 2015 to deal with the issue, a first in Colombian history. The Colombian security forces then began to remove and disassemble illegal mining machinery, and by the conclusion of 2016, all illegal mining apparatuses were no longer present in La Toma. Márquez's efforts and later successes earned her praise internationally and helped inspire other communities in the region to combat illegal mining. As a result of her efforts, Márquez was awarded the Goldman Environmental Prize in 2018.

Colombian peace process

In December 2014, Márquez travelled to Havana, Cuba, to participate in the peace negotiations between the administration of president Juan Manuel Santos and the Revolutionary Armed Forces of Colombia (FARC). Whilst there, Márquez highlighted how the conflict had disproportionately affected Afro-Colombians and particularly black women. She also emphasised that ethnic minority groups needed to take part in the peace dialogue to ensure the preservation of lasting peace and stability.

In June 2020, Márquez was elected to the National Peace and Co-existence council, established in May 2017, to monitor compliance with the peace agreement. She served as the council's president in 2021.

2022 presidential election

Francia Márquez announced her candidacy for the 2022 presidential election in April 2021, during the National Feminist Convention. The Estamos Listas movement and fellow primary candidate Angelá María Robledo offered their support for Marquez's campaign.

In her campaign, she has advocated for women, Afro-Colombians and indigenous communities; who have been largely excluded from Colombian politics.

In December 2021, after her campaign could not collect the necessary signatures to be an independent candidate, the Alternative Democratic Pole party endorsed Márquez's campaign.

In the March 2022 primary elections for the Historic Pact nomination, Márquez reached a historical result of 783,160 votes. This result placed her in second place after Gustavo Petro – with the second-highest vote total out of all the primary candidates.

Vice presidential campaign

On 23 March 2022, she accepted the nomination for vice president on the ticket for the Historic Pact, joining Gustavo Petro. Márquez subsequently promised that if elected, she would move the vice president's office from Bogotá to Medellín. Petro announced that if victorious, Márquez's role as vice president would include bolstering equality for ethnic groups and regions facing exclusion. Petro pledged to establish the ministry of equality, which Márquez would lead.

In early May 2022, Márquez accused the United States and the U.S. ambassador to Colombia, Philip Goldberg, of attempting to interfere with the elections. Goldberg responded by expressing concern about "the possible intervention of other countries". Márquez's claim arose after Goldberg alleged that Venezuela and Russia would try to interfere in the elections. She further expressed, "Although he (Goldberg) did not mention the Historical Pact or Gustavo Petro, it is obvious that he was referring to our candidacy and our political bet." Despite this, Márquez assured that if victorious, a potential Petro administration would not cut ties with the United States.

During the campaign, Márquez and Gustavo Petro faced numerous death threats. In one instance, while campaigning, Márquez was targeted by laser beams from a nearby building, prompting security guards to shield her from what appeared to be an assassination attempt. In response to this and many other similar situations, 90 elected officials and prominent individuals from over 20 countries signed an open letter expressing concern and condemnation of attempts of political violence against Márquez and Petro. The letter also highlighted the assassination of over 50 social leaders, trade unionists, environmentalists and other community representatives in 2022. Signatories of the letter included former Ecuadorian president Rafael Correa and American linguist and philosopher Noam Chomsky.

On election day, which occurred on 29 May, Márquez's Historic Pact ticket placed first, advancing to the runoff, since no candidate received over 50% of the vote. Márquez and Petro faced Rodolfo Hernández and Marelen Castillo. Shortly after the first round, Márquez and Petro received the endorsement of Luis Gilberto Murillo for the second round. Murillo had been the running of Sergio Fajardo in the Hope Center Coalition, which did not qualify for the runoff. Márquez and Petro went on to defeat Hernández and Castillo in the second round held on 19 June. Upon her electoral triumph, Márquez proclaimed that the Petro administration would not "expropriate anyone". She said the most significant challenge she faced whilst on the campaign trail was racist attacks. Márquez's inauguration as vice president occurred on 7 August 2022. On the other hand, due to the approval needed by Congress to establish the ministry of equality, Márquez may not assume the leadership of the proposed department until mid-way through her term as vice president.

Vice Presidency (2022–present) 

Márquez was sworn in as vice president on 7 August 2022.

She escaped another assassination attempt in January 2023. An explosive charge, found in time by the police in charge of her security, had been hidden on the road leading to her home.

Since taking office, Francia Márquez has also been the target of multiple racist attacks.

Further reading 
 Ferry, Elizabeth & Ferry, Stephen (Winter 2018). "Mining and the Defense of Afro-Colombian Territory: The Community of Yolombó, Colombia". ReVista: Harvard Review of Latin America.
 Kane, Patrick (3 December 2014). "Why Did 22 Afro-Colombian Women Occupy the Colombian Interior Ministry for Five Days?", Huffington Post UK.

Notes

References

External links 

 

1981 births
Living people
21st-century Colombian politicians
Afro-Colombian women
BBC 100 Women
Colombian environmentalists
Colombian human rights activists
Colombian women environmentalists
Goldman Environmental Prize awardees
People from Cauca Department
Vice presidents of Colombia
Women human rights activists
Women vice presidents